Relaxin' at Camarillo is an album by American jazz saxophonist Joe Henderson recorded in 1979 and released on the Contemporary label. Featuring Henderson with keyboardist Chick Corea, and two rhythm sections-bassist Richard Davis and drummer Tony Williams on two tracks, and bassist Tony Dumas and drummer Peter Erskine on the remaining three.

Reception 
The Allmusic review states "This informal session has plenty of fine solos from the two principals and is recommended to fans of advanced hard bop".

Track listing 
 "Y Todavia la Quiero" (Joe Henderson) – 11:42
 "My One and Only Love" (Robert Mellin, Guy Wood) – 9:59
 "Crimson Lake" (Chick Corea) – 5:26
 "Yes, My Dear" (Corea) – 8:44
 "Relaxin' at Camarillo" (Charlie Parker) – 9:21

Personnel 
Joe Henderson – tenor saxophone
Chick Corea – piano
Richard Davis (tracks 3 & 4), Tony Dumas (tracks 1, 2 & 5) – bass
Peter Erskine (tracks 1, 2 & 5), Tony Williams (Tracks 3 & 4) – drums

References 

Contemporary Records albums
Joe Henderson albums
1981 albums